United Nations Security Council Resolution 2043 was unanimously adopted on 21 April 2012.

The resolution resulted in the setting up of the United Nations Supervision Mission in Syria to observe the implementation of the Kofi Annan peace plan for Syria on the Syrian Civil War. The United Nations Supervision Mission in Syria was frozen in early June 2012, following an increasingly unstable and violent situation in Syria.

See also 
List of United Nations Security Council Resolutions 2001 to 2100
List of United Nations resolutions concerning Syria

References

External links
Text of the Resolution at undocs.org

2012 United Nations Security Council resolutions
 2043
2012 in Syria
International reactions to the Syrian civil war
April 2012 events